Bohdan Volodymyrovych Kutiepov is a Ukrainian journalist and freelance musician (bayan). Along with Haydamaky, in 2014 recorded a musical video clip "Arkana".

Biography
Born in Kyiv, Kutiepov graduated the high school No.2 in Yahotyn (Kyiv Oblast). In 2006 he graduated the Journalism Institute of the Kyiv University.

Between 2006 and 2010 Kutepov worked as a journalist-investigator for several television channels: Tonis, STB, and TVi. During that period in 2008 he married another journalist from ICTV, Khrystyna Kotsira. After that Kutepov worked for journal Telekritika. Since 2013, he is a journalist of Hromadske TV.

He was attacked by the police when reporting protests against the government’s quarantine restrictions in Kyiv in May 2020.

Music videos
 2013 – "Azarov, Arbuzov"
 2014 – "Arkana"

External links
 Kostanyan, A. Bohdan Kutiepov: STB owners interested in creating image of non-compromised journalists. Telekritika. November 12, 2007
 Profile at Vpershe Chuyu.
 Arkana at YouTube

References

Living people
1984 births
Musicians from Kyiv
Taras Shevchenko National University of Kyiv alumni
Journalists from Kyiv
Television presenters from Kyiv
People of the Euromaidan
Hromadske.TV people
Ukrainian accordionists
Ukrainian people of Russian descent
Pryamiy kanal people
STB (TV channel) people
TVi (TV channel) people
21st-century accordionists